Encurtido is a pickled appetizer, side dish and condiment in the Mesoamerican region. It consists of various vegetables, such as onion, peppers such as jalapeño, carrot and beets, among others, pickled in vinegar brine and typically prepared so the vegetables remain crunchy and firm to the bite. When used as a condiment, it is added to many various dishes to add flavor. It is typically served cold.

Encurtido is a common dish in Honduran cuisine, and is sometimes used to add spiciness to various foods. It is also a common condiment "throughout coastal Central America" that is used as an "all-purpose" sauce in these areas. It is also commonly used in Mexican cuisine and Mexican-American cuisine as a table condiment. In the United States and other areas, mass-produced jarred or canned encurtido consisting of chili peppers, carrot and onion is sold in Mexican markets.

It is a relatively simple dish to prepare, in which denser vegetables such as carrots and beets are gently boiled or simmered in water until slightly softened, and then these and other softer vegetables such as onions, which do not require pre-cooking, are added to a boiling vinegar brine.

In Honduras, encurtido has been commercially prepared since at least 1898. At that time, the product was typically bottled with a hermetic seal to prevent spoilage, and labels were attached to the bottles. Bottling was performed in part due to the climate in Honduras, which made unbottled encurtido prone to swift spoilage.

See also
 
 Curtido – a lightly fermented cabbage relish
 
 Giardiniera – an Italian relish of pickled vegetables in vinegar or oil
 List of pickled foods
 Pickled carrot

References

External links
 

Central American cuisine
Condiments
Honduran cuisine
Pickles